Johannes, 11th Prince of Thurn and Taxis (5 June 1926 – 14 December 1990) was a German businessman and head of the House of Thurn und Taxis from 1982 until his death.

Early life
Johannes was born at Schloss Höfling in Regensburg, Germany, to Karl August, 10th Prince of Thurn and Taxis, and Infanta Maria Anna de Braganza. He had two older sisters and one younger brother.

Marriage and family
In the 1970s Johannes threw avant-garde parties and, because he was bisexual, he was often seen in gay discos. Before he was married, his "constant companion" was Princess Henriette von Auersperg, later von Bohlen und Halbach.

On 31 May 1980 he married the much younger Countess Gloria of Schönburg-Glauchau (born 1960). The pair were fourth cousins twice removed, both descended from Karl Alexander, 5th Prince of Thurn and Taxis. The Schönburg-Glauchaus were a mediatised branch of the Schönburg dynasty of counts, which still possessed large estates in Germany after World War I, but became refugees in Africa under the Nazi regime and fell on hard times.  The couple attracted massive media attention into the mid 1980s, with a haut bohème lifestyle locating them among the jet set and the  Princess Gloria's over-the-top appearance (characterized by bright hair color and flashy clothes) prompted Vanity Fair to describe her as "Princess TNT, the dynamite socialite", a sobriquet that stayed with her a long time.  The couple had three children:
 Maria Theresia Ludowika Klothilde Helene Alexandra (born 28 November 1980 in Regensburg). On 13 September 2014, she married Hugo Wilson, a British artist, in Tutzing, Germany. They have two daughters.
 Mafalda Beatrix Maria Wilson (born 21 August 2015).
 Maya Romy Alexandra Wilson (born 22 September 2017).
 Elisabeth Margarethe Maria Anna Beatriz (born 24 March 1982 in Regensburg).
 Albert (II.) Maria Lamoral Miguel Johannes Gabriel (born 24 June 1983 in Regensburg).

Upon the death of his father in 1982, Johannes became the head of the Thurn and Taxis family. He died on 14 December 1990 after two unsuccessful heart transplants within two days, in Munich-Großhadern. With a legacy of U.S. $500 million in debts, his widow was forced to simplify her way of life to master the fiscal responsibilities of probating his estate and securing what remained of her husband's fortune.

Honours

Dynastic honours 
Dynastic orders of non-reigning families:
 House of Thurn und Taxis: Sovereign Knight Grand Cross of the Order of Parfaite Amitié
 Saxon Royal Family: Knight Grand Cross of the Order of the Rue Crown
 Portuguese Royal Family: Knight Grand Cross of the Order of the Immaculate Conception of Vila Viçosa
 Russian Imperial Family: Knight Grand Cordon of the Imperial Order of Saint Stanislaus

National and foreign honours
 Commander of the Order of Merit of the Federal Republic of Germany
Sovereign Military Order of Malta: Bailiff Knight Grand Cross of Honour and Devotion of the Sovereign Military Order of Malta, 3rd First Class

Ancestry

Sources

 Wolfgang Behringer. Thurn und Taxis: Die Geschichte ihrer Post und ihrer Unternehmen. München/Zürich: 1990. 
 Martin Dallmeier and Martha Schad. Das Fürstliche Haus Thurn und Taxis, 300 Jahre Geschichte in Bildern. Regensburg: 1996. 
 Bernd-Ulrich Hergemöller. Mann für Mann. page 689

References

External links

 Thurn und Taxis family homepage
 Bild:Im Bett mit Gloria

1926 births
1990 deaths
Hereditary Princes of Thurn and Taxis
Commanders Crosses of the Order of Merit of the Federal Republic of Germany
Knights of the Order of the Immaculate Conception of Vila Viçosa
Knights Grand Cross of the Order of the Immaculate Conception of Vila Viçosa
Knights of Malta
Recipients of the Order of Saint Stanislaus (Russian)
LGBT royalty
20th-century German businesspeople
German LGBT businesspeople
German billionaires
German landowners
20th-century Christians
20th-century Roman Catholics
German Roman Catholics
LGBT Roman Catholics
German people of Portuguese descent
German people of Austrian descent
German people of Liechtenstein descent
German people of Hungarian descent
German people of French descent
German people of Spanish descent
German people of Italian descent
Burials at the Gruftkapelle, St. Emmeram's Abbey